There have been 37 full-time managers of Blackpool F.C. (including repeat appointments). The longest-serving manager was Joe Smith, who occupied the role for 23 years;
Michael Appleton, meanwhile, lasted 65 days in the role. The club has, on average, appointed a new manager just under every three years. As of March 2020, the club has had ten full-time managers in eight years.

There have been four repeat appointments: Bob Stokoe, Allan Brown, Simon Grayson and Michael Appleton.

In 2014, Jose Riga became the club's first foreign manager.

In 2020, Neil Critchley became the first appointment to be known as a head coach.

List of managers
The statistics in the table below account for Football League and Premier League games only. Play-off games are excluded.

 – Also played for Blackpool
 – Norman was the club's first full-time manager

Notes

References 
Specific

 
Blackpool F.C.